Scott Peter Wilson (born 19 March 1977) is a Scottish former footballer, who played for Rangers, Portsmouth, Dunfermline Athletic and North Queensland Fury. Wilson represented Scotland at under-21 international level.

Club career
Wilson signed for Rangers in 1993 from the club's youth system. He made his debut as a 19-year-old in a UEFA Champions League defeat against Ajax at Ibrox in 1996. Having been sent off in an Old Firm match which contributed to a heavy defeat at the hands of Celtic in November 1998, Wilson regained his place in the squad for the 1–0 victory over the same opposition in the 1999 Scottish Cup Final in which he appeared as a substitute, and contributed to Scottish Premier League title wins for the club in that campaign and the next. He made a total of 75 appearances for Rangers, scoring one goal against Dundee United, before moving to Portsmouth on loan near the end of the 2001–02 season. He played five times during this loan spell, but did not earn a permanent contract and returned to Scotland.

Wilson then signed for Dunfermline Athletic on 5 August 2002. He made his Dunfermline debut in a 6–0 defeat to his former employers Rangers, just two weeks later. Wilson played in the 2006 Scottish League Cup Final and the 2007 Scottish Cup Final, both of which ended in defeat to Celtic; his defensive colleagues included former Rangers youth teammate Greg Shields. He scored one of Dunfermline's goals in the 2007 Scottish Challenge Cup Final, but this was also lost to St Johnstone. One of his last appearances for the club in April 2009 was an opportunity to reach another final, but the Scottish Cup semi-final at Hampden Park was lost to Falkirk, one of their local rivals. In his seven-year spell at Dunfermline, he played in over 200 fixtures in the league alone.

Wilson joined Australian A-League team North Queensland Fury for the 2009–10 season after agreeing to a two-year contract on 6 March 2009.

International career
Wilson played 6 matches for the Scotland under–21 team during his time with Rangers. His performances for Dunfermline earned him selection for the Scotland B squad (then known as "Scotland Future"), but he did not play due to illness.

References

External links
 North Queensland Fury profile
 

1977 births
Living people
Scottish footballers
Footballers from Edinburgh
Association football defenders
Rangers F.C. players
Portsmouth F.C. players
Dunfermline Athletic F.C. players
Northern Fury FC players
A-League Men players
English Football League players
Scottish Premier League players
Scottish Football League players
Scotland under-21 international footballers
People educated at Trinity Academy, Edinburgh
Scottish expatriate sportspeople in Australia
Scottish expatriate footballers
Expatriate soccer players in Australia